Micaiah John Muller Hill FRS (1856–1929) was an English mathematician, known for Hill's spherical vortex and Hill's tetrahedra.

He was born on 22 February 1856 in Berhampore, Bengal, India, the son of Revd. Samuel John Hill (1825–1881) and Leonora Josephina Muller (1833–1917).

Hill received a bachelor's degree in 1873 and an M.A. in 1876 from University College, London. In 1880–1884 he was a professor of mathematics at Mason College (which later became Birmingham University). In 1891 he earned his Sc.D. from Cambridge University. From 1884 to 1907 he was Professor of Pure Mathematics at University College, London and from 1907 to 1923 Astor Professor of Mathematics, University of London.

In 1894 Hill was elected FRS. In 1926 and 1927 he served as president of the Mathematical Association.

Hill was one of the people to whom C. L. T. Griffith sent, in 1912, some of Ramanujan's work.

He married Minnie Grace Tarbotton, daughter of Marriott Ogle Tarbotton at St Saviour's Church, Paddington on 21 December 1892. 
His two sons were Roderic Hill and Geoffrey T. R. Hill.

See also
List of Vice-Chancellors of the University of London

References

External links
Professor M. J. M. Hill, FRS, Vice-Chancellor of London University (1909-1911) by John Wheatley (painting provided by BBC)

1856 births
1929 deaths
19th-century English mathematicians
20th-century English mathematicians
Fellows of the Royal Society
Alumni of Peterhouse, Cambridge
Alumni of University College London
Academics of University College London
Academics of the University of Birmingham
Vice-Chancellors of the University of London